Janeži is a small settlement in the hills west of Sodražica in southern Slovenia. The area is part of the traditional region of Lower Carniola and is now included in the Southeast Slovenia Statistical Region.

Together with the villages of Betonovo, Kračali, Petrinci, and Kržeti it comprises the community and Parish of Gora nad Sodražico, also known as Gora.

There is a small chapel in the village dedicated to Our Lady of the Snows. It was built in the first quarter of the 20th century.

References

External links
Janeži on Geopedia

Populated places in the Municipality of Sodražica